Monte Ceresino is a mountain of Lombardy, Italy, located in the Province of Pavia. It has an elevation of 433 metres.

It is located at the top of two different valleys: that of the Rile (a hamlet in Lombardy), which descends to Casteggio, and that of San Zeno, which descends to Fumo. Part of the mountains slopes in the central-eastern part of Oltrepò Pavese are cultivated with Vineyards.

References

Mountains of Lombardy